Yagapriya (pronounced yāgapriya) is a rāgam in Carnatic music (musical scale of South Indian classical music). It is the 31st melakarta rāgam in the 72 melakarta rāgam system of Carnatic music. It is called Kalāvati in Muthuswami Dikshitar school of Carnatic music. Like many other rāgas, Kalāvati has been adopted in Hindustani music as well.

Structure and Lakshana

It is the 1st rāgam in the 6th chakra Rutu. The mnemonic name is Rutu-Pa. The mnemonic phrase is sa ru gu ma pa dha na. Its  structure (ascending and descending scale) is as follows (see swaras in Carnatic music for details on below notation and terms):
: 
: 

The notes shatsruthi rishabham, antara gandharam, shuddha madhyamam, shuddha dhaivatham and shuddha nishadham are used in this rāgam. As Yagapriya is a melakarta, by definition it is a sampoorna rāgam (has all seven notes in ascending and descending scale). It is the shuddha madhyamam equivalent of Sucharitra, which is the 67th melakarta scale.

Janya rāgams 
Yagapriya has a few minor janya rāgams (derived scales) associated with it. See List of janya rāgams for full list of rāgams associated with Yagapriya.

Compositions
A few compositions set to Yagapriya rāgam are:

Kalavati kamalasyanu by Muthuswami Dikshitar
Shambho sadashiva by Koteeswara Iyer

Related rāgams
This section covers the theoretical and scientific aspect of this rāgam.

Yagapriya's notes when shifted using Graha bhedam, does not yield any melakarta rāgams. Graha bhedam is the step taken in keeping the relative note frequencies same, while shifting the shadjam to the next note in the rāgam.

Notes

References

Melakarta ragas